The Majnoon Oil Field is a super-giant oil field located  from Basra in southern Iraq. Majnoon is one of the richest oil fields in the world with an estimated 38 billion barrels of oil in place. The field was named Majnoon which means crazy in Arabic in reference to excessive amount of oil in a dense area.

History
The field was discovered by Braspetro, a Brazilian company in 1975, under the leadership of Bolivar Montenegro Guerra in a shallow Upper Cretaceous formation. Development came to a halt in 1980 during the engineering phase of the project, due to Iran–Iraq War, particularly Operation Kheibar. At the time, Braspetro had finished drilling of 20 wells and pressed 14 drilling rigs into service. In the course of the war, Iran occupied and sabotaged the area. After the war, Southern Oil Company of Iraq restarted the production. In 1990's, Total S.A. of France negotiated a development contract with Saddam Hussein but was unable to sign the deal due to United Nations sanctions imposed on Iraq. The deal was eventually annulled by Hussein in 2002. In 2007, Total and Chevron signed an agreement with Iraqi government to explore Majnoon field.

The consortium was awarded the contract out of 44 international companies, participating in the auction, with China National Petroleum Corporation (CNPC), ExxonMobil, Sinochem Corporation, Total specifically bidding on Majnoon field. The finalist alliance of CNPC and Total offering $1.75/barrel lost the bid. The deal intends a 20-year service and development of the field. The contract was approved by Council of Ministers of Iraq on January 5, 2010.

Shell agreed at the end of 2017 to exit the venture and hand over its operation to Basra Oil Company (BOC) by the end of June 2018. Shell was the operator and holder of 45 percent at Majnoon, with Malaysia's Petronas owning 30 percent, and Iraq's Missan Oil Company holding the remaining 25 percent. In June 2018 officials from Shell and Basra Oil Company met to mark the handing over of the operations of the field.

In April 2018, Anton Oilfield Services signed Integrated Facilities Management Services Contract (IFMS) a two-year deal with Iraq's oil ministry with a one year extension option to operate the maintenance and production of the Majnoon field on behalf of Basra Oil Company.

In January 2021, Anton Oilfield Services and Basra Oil Company agreed to renew the IFMS for two more years of one year extension option. 

In May 2018, KBR, Inc. announced that it has been awarded an engineering, procurement and construction management contract (EPCM) by Basra Oil Company (BOC) for the development of project and construction side of the Majnoon Oil Field in Basra, Iraq.

Licences
Until June 2018 (when Shell - the operator exited) Shell held a 45% stake in all licences, Petronas 30% and Iraqi Ministry of Oil 25%.

Reservoir
Majnoon's first pay zone consists of Upper Cretaceous which proved  of oil per day. Mishrif carbonates, Nahr Umr sands (Middle Cretaceous) and Shuaiba carbonates and Zubair sands (Lower Cretaceous) form the pay zones.

Production
According to the deal, the consortium will increase production to a peak  of oil per day within seven-year period. Majnoon was the first Iraqi field out of 10 major ones offered to international companies for development. The official start date was March 1, 2010. In the Phase I of the project, the consortium intends to increase the production from 45,000 to  within two-year period.

The production at Majnoon will move Iraq from the current 11th place to the 3rd among oil producing nations after Saudi Arabia and Iran. The country sits on 150 billion of oil and currently produces . Iraq expects to top the oil production to  within six years, thus competing with Saudi Arabia.

See also

Ghawar Field
Rumaila oil field
Majnoon Island

References

External links
 Map of Iraqi Oil and Gas Developments from Rigzone
 Iraq oil
 Braspetro

Oil fields of Iraq